Canthigaster figueiredoi, known as the Southern Atlantic sharpnose-puffer, is a species of marine fish in the family Tetraodontidae. It was first isolated from the east coast of South America, in the Atlantic Ocean.

Etymology
It is named in honor of Jose Lima de Figueiredo (b. 1943), a Brazilian fish taxonomist, of the Museu de Zoologia da Universidade de São Paulo, for his contributions to the advancement of the taxonomy of Brazilian marine fishes.

Description
This particular species differs from other Atlantic Canthigaster species by the long extension of the horizontal dark stripe on its flank (originating on the ventral caudal fin's margin). The latter reaches the pectoral fin. Compared to C. jamestyleri by the presence of a dark caudal-fin margin; the absence of bars on the caudal fin; its possession of less stripes and spots on its dorsum; and by the absence of a small black spot on its anal fin. It is often found in pairs, and feeds on vegetation, sponges, crustaceans, and mollusks.

Distribution
Its geographical range is estimated between latitudes 9°N and 33°S, which includes southern Caribbean to Santa Catarina, Brazil, including islands of the Atol das Rocas and Fernando de Noronha.

References

Further reading
Martinez, Pablo Ariel, Washington Candeia de Araujo, and Wagner Franco Molina. "Derived cytogenetic traits, multiple NORs and B chromosomes in the compact karyotype of Canthigaster figueiredoi (Tetraodontiformes)." Marine genomics 3.2 (2010): 85–89.
Pinheiro, H. T., et al. "Reef fish structure and distribution in a south‐western Atlantic Ocean tropical island.” Journal of Fish Biology 79.7 (2011): 1984–2006.
Pinheiro, Hudson Tercio, Jean-Christophe Joyeux, and Agnaldo Silva Martins. "Reef fisheries and underwater surveys indicate overfishing of a Brazilian coastal island." Natureza & Conservação 8 (2010): 151–159.
GROTTA GREMPEL, RICARDO S., and CLÁUDIO LS SAMPAIO. "Fishes (Elasmobranchii and Actinopterygii) of Picãozinho reef, Northeastern Brazil, with notes on their conservation status." Zootaxa 1608 (2007): 11–19.

External links
FishBase

figueiredoi
Taxa named by Rodrigo Leão de Moura
Taxa named by Ricardo Macedo Corrêa e Castro
Fish described in 2002